Anthropological Linguistics is a peer-reviewed academic journal covering studies on anthropological linguistics. It was established in 1959 by the American Indian Studies Research Institute and the Department of Anthropology of Indiana University. The departments currently publish it in association with the University of Nebraska Press.

Abstracting and indexing
The journal is abstracted and indexed in:

Anthropological Literature
Communication & Mass Media Index
CSA (Linguistics & Language Behavior Abstracts, Sociological Abstracts)
EBSCO databases (Academic Search)
Humanities Abstracts
Index Islamicus
International Bibliography of Periodical Literature
International Bibliography of the Social Sciences
Linguistic Bibliography
Modern Language Association
ProQuest (Periodicals Index Online)
Scopus

Editor-in-chief
Douglas R. Parks

Notes

References

External links

Publications established in 1959
1959 establishments in the United States
Anthropological linguistics
Indiana University Bloomington
English-language journals
Quarterly journals